"Tú y Yo Volvemos al Amor" is a song written and recorded by the Spanish singer-songwriter Mónica Naranjo. It was released as the seventh single from the album in 1998. On February 6, 2009, American duo Ha*Ash recorded a cover version for their third studio album "Habitación Doble" (2008).

Song information 
"Tú y Yo Volvemos al Amor" was written by Mónica Naranjo and Cristóbal Sansano a while its production was done by Cristóbal Sansano. Is a song recorded by Spanish singer Mónica Naranjo from her second studio album Palabra de Mujer (1997). It was released as the seventh single from the album in 2008, by Sony Music Entertainment. Is the tenth track from Mónica Naranjo's second studio album Palabra de Mujer. It was released as the seventh single from the album in 1998.

Music video 
In the video for "Tu y Yo Volvemos al Amor", Mónica Naranjo is singing the song to an audience in a circular stage in 1998.

Credits and personnel 
Credits.

 Mónica Naranjo  – vocals, songwriting, producer
 Cristóbal Sansano  – songwriting, producer, arranger, programming

Track listing 

Versions

 Studio 
Álbum Versión — 04:32

 Live
 Versión Tour Palabra de mujer
 Versión Tour Grandiosas Internacional

Ha*Ash version 

"Tu y Yo Volvemos al Amor" is a song by American duo Ha*Ash for their third studio album "Habitación Doble" (2008). It was released on February 6, 2009 as the third of the single. It was written by Cristóbal Sansano and Monica Naranjo while the song was produced by Graeme Pleeth and Mauri Stern. The music official video for the song hasn't been released.

Charts

Release history

References 

1998 songs
1998 singles
2009 singles
Ha*Ash songs
Sony Music Latin singles
Song recordings produced by Graeme Pleeth
Song recordings produced by Mauri Stern
Spanish-language songs